This is an incomplete list of Statutory Rules of Northern Ireland in 2000.

1-100

 Housing Benefit (General) (Amendment) Regulations (Northern Ireland) 2000 (S.R. 2000 No. 1)
 Social Security (Education Maintenance Allowance Amendment) Regulations (Northern Ireland) 2000 (S.R. 2000 No. 2)
 Social Security and Child Support (Decisions and Appeals) (Amendment) Regulations (Northern Ireland) 2000 (S.R. 2000 No. 3)
 Social Security (Incapacity for Work) (Miscellaneous Amendments) Regulations (Northern Ireland) 2000 (S.R. 2000 No. 4)
 Employment Relations (1999 Order) (Commencement No. 2 and Transitional Provision) Order (Northern Ireland) 2000 (S.R. 2000 No. 5)
 Employment Rights (Increase of Limits) Order (Northern Ireland) 2000 (S.R. 2000 No. 6)
 Working Time (Amendment) Regulations (Northern Ireland) 2000 (S.R. 2000 No. 7)
 Equal Opportunities (Employment Legislation) (Territorial Limits) Regulations (Northern Ireland) 2000 (S.R. 2000 No. 8)
 Jobseeker's Allowance (Amendment) Regulations (Northern Ireland) 2000 (S.R. 2000 No. 9)
 Rabies (Importation of Dogs, Cats and Other Mammals) (Amendment) Order (Northern Ireland) 2000 (S.R. 2000 No. 10)
 Local Government (Superannuation) (Amendment) Regulations (Northern Ireland) 2000 (S.R. 2000 No. 23)
 Plant Protection Products (Amendment) Regulations (Northern Ireland) 2000 (S.R. 2000 No. 24)
 Class Sizes in Primary Schools Regulations (Northern Ireland) 2000 (S.R. 2000 No. 27)
 Planning (Fees) (Amendment) Regulations (Northern Ireland) 2000 (S.R. 2000 No. 35)
 Guaranteed Minimum Pensions Increase Order (Northern Ireland) 2000 (S.R. 2000 No. 36)
 Jobseeker's Allowance (Amendment No. 2) Regulations (Northern Ireland) 2000 (S.R. 2000 No. 37)
 Social Security Benefits Up-rating Order (Northern Ireland) 2000 (S.R. 2000 No. 38)
 Inshore Fishing (Daily Close Time for Scallops) Regulations (Northern Ireland) 2000 (S.R. 2000 No. 39)
 Food Protection (Shellfish Emergency Prohibitions) (Revocation) Order (Northern Ireland) 2000 (S.R. 2000 No. 40)
 Rates (Regional Rates) Order (Northern Ireland) 2000 (S.R. 2000 No. 41)
 Rules of the Supreme Court (Northern Ireland) (Amendment) 2000 (S.R. 2000 No. 42)
 Local Government (Defined Activities) (Exemptions) Order (Northern Ireland) 2000 (S.R. 2000 No. 43)
 Registered Rents (Increase) Order (Northern Ireland) 2000 (S.R. 2000 No. 46)
 Social Security Benefits Up-rating Regulations (Northern Ireland) 2000 (S.R. 2000 No. 47)
 Social Security Benefits Up-rating and Miscellaneous Increases Regulations (Northern Ireland) 2000 (S.R. 2000 No. 48)
 Social Fund (Maternity and Funeral Expenses) (General) (Amendment) Regulations (Northern Ireland) 2000 (S.R. 2000 No. 49)
 Employment Rights (Increase of Limits) (No. 2) Order (Northern Ireland) 2000 (S.R. 2000 No. 50)
 Optical Charges and Payments and General Ophthalmic Services (Amendment) Regulations (Northern Ireland) 2000 (S.R. 2000 No. 51)
 Beet Seeds (Amendment) Regulations (Northern Ireland) 2000 (S.R. 2000 No. 52)
 Cereal Seeds (Amendment) Regulations (Northern Ireland) 2000 (S.R. 2000 No. 53)
 Fodder Plant Seeds (Amendment) Regulations (Northern Ireland) 2000 (S.R. 2000 No. 54)
 Oil and Fibre Plant Seeds (Amendment) Regulations (Northern Ireland) 2000 (S.R. 2000 No. 55)
 Vegetable Seeds (Amendment) Regulations (Northern Ireland) 2000 (S.R. 2000 No. 56)
 Charges for Drugs and Appliances (Amendment) Regulations (Northern Ireland) 2000 (S.R. 2000 No. 57)
 Dental Charges (Amendment) Regulations (Northern Ireland) 2000 (S.R. 2000 No. 58)
 Disabled Persons (Badges for Motor Vehicles) (Amendment) Regulations (Northern Ireland) 2000 (S.R. 2000 No. 59)
 Occupational and Personal Pension Schemes (Levy) (Amendment) Regulations (Northern Ireland) 2000 (S.R. 2000 No. 60)
 Assistance for Minor Works to Dwellings (Amendment) Regulations (Northern Ireland) 2000 (S.R. 2000 No. 61)
 Housing Renovation etc. Grants (Reduction of Grant) (Amendment) Regulations (Northern Ireland) 2000 (S.R. 2000 No. 62)
 Price Marking Order (Northern Ireland) 2000 (S.R. 2000 No. 63)
 Pensions Increase (Review) Order (Northern Ireland) 2000 (S.R. 2000 No. 64)
 Housing Benefit (General) (Amendment No. 2) Regulations (Northern Ireland) 2000 (S.R. 2000 No. 65)
 Welfare Reform and Pensions (1999 Order) (Commencement No. 2) Order (Northern Ireland) 2000 (S.R. 2000 No. 68)
 Occupational Pension Schemes (Miscellaneous Amendments) Regulations (Northern Ireland) 2000 (S.R. 2000 No. 69)
 Education and Libraries (Defined Activities) (Exemptions) (Amendment) Order (Northern Ireland) 2000 (S.R. 2000 No. 70)
 Social Security (Immigration and Asylum) Consequential Amendments Regulations (Northern Ireland) 2000 (S.R. 2000 No. 71)
 Food (Animal Products from Belgium) (Emergency Control) Order (Northern Ireland) 2000 (S.R. 2000 No. 72)
 Animal Feedingstuffs from Belgium (Control) Regulations (Northern Ireland) 2000 (S.R. 2000 No. 73)
 Social Security (Miscellaneous Amendments) Regulations (Northern Ireland) 2000 (S.R. 2000 No. 74)
 Workmen's Compensation (Supplementation) (Amendment) Regulations (Northern Ireland) 2000 (S.R. 2000 No. 75)
 Welfare of Animals (Slaughter or Killing) (Amendment) Regulations (Northern Ireland) 2000 (S.R. 2000 No. 76)
 Food Protection (Shellfish Emergency Prohibitions) (Revocation) (No. 2) Order (Northern Ireland) 2000 (S.R. 2000 No. 77)
 Food Standards Act 1999 (Transitional and Consequential Provisions and Savings) Regulations (Northern Ireland) 2000 (S.R. 2000 No. 78)
 Legal Aid (Financial Conditions) Regulations (Northern Ireland) 2000 (S.R. 2000 No. 79)
 Legal Advice and Assistance (Financial Conditions) Regulations (Northern Ireland) 2000 (S.R. 2000 No. 80)
 Legal Advice and Assistance (Amendment) Regulations (Northern Ireland) 2000 (S.R. 2000 No. 81)
 Food Protection (Shellfish Emergency Prohibitions) (Strangford Lough) (Amendment) Order (Northern Ireland) 2000 (S.R. 2000 No. 82)
 Dairy Produce Quotas (Amendment) Regulations (Northern Ireland) 2000 (S.R. 2000 No. 83)
 Environmental Impact Assessment (Forestry) Regulations (Northern Ireland) 2000 (S.R. 2000 No. 84)
 Electrical Equipment for Explosive Atmospheres (Certification) (Amendment) Regulations (Northern Ireland) 2000 (S.R. 2000 No. 85)
 Health and Safety at Work Order (Application to Environmentally Hazardous Substances) (Amendment) Regulations (Northern Ireland) 2000 (S.R. 2000 No. 86)
 Police (Health and Safety) Regulations (Northern Ireland) 2000 (S.R. 2000 No. 87)
 Social Fund Winter Fuel Payment Regulations (Northern Ireland) 2000 (S.R. 2000 No. 91)
 Control of Major Accident Hazards Regulations (Northern Ireland) 2000 (S.R. 2000 No. 93)
 Food Protection (Sheep Emergency Prohibitions) (Revocation) Order (Northern Ireland) 2000 (S.R. 2000 No. 94)
 Control of Asbestos at Work (Amendment) Regulations (Northern Ireland) 2000 (S.R. 2000 No. 98)
 Asbestos (Prohibitions) (Amendment) Regulations (Northern Ireland) 2000 (S.R. 2000 No. 99)
 Asbestos (Licensing) (Amendment) Regulations (Northern Ireland) 2000 (S.R. 2000 No. 100)

101-200

 Planning (Control of Major-Accident Hazards) Regulations (Northern Ireland) 2000 (S.R. 2000 No. 101)
 Travelling Expenses and Remission of Charges (Amendment) Regulations (Northern Ireland) 2000 (S.R. 2000 No. 102)
 Income Support (General) (Standard Interest Rate Amendment) Regulations (Northern Ireland) 2000 (S.R. 2000 No. 103)
 Social Security (Maternity Allowance) (Earnings) Regulations (Northern Ireland) 2000 (S.R. 2000 No. 104)
 Social Security (Incapacity for Work) (Miscellaneous Amendments No. 2) Regulations (Northern Ireland) 2000 (S.R. 2000 No. 105)
 Social Security (Overlapping Benefits) (Amendment) Regulations (Northern Ireland) 2000 (S.R. 2000 No. 106)
 Occupational and Personal Pension Schemes (Penalties) Regulations (Northern Ireland) 2000 (S.R. 2000 No. 107)
 Potatoes Originating in Egypt (Amendment) Regulations (Northern Ireland) 2000 (S.R. 2000 No. 108)
 Social Security (Approved Work) Regulations (Northern Ireland) 2000 (S.R. 2000 No. 109)
 Poultry Breeding Flocks and Hatcheries Scheme (Amendment) Order (Northern Ireland) 2000 (S.R. 2000 No. 110)
 Planning (General Development) (Amendment) Order (Northern Ireland) 2000 (S.R. 2000 No. 113)
 Personal Social Services (Direct Payments) (Amendment) Regulations (Northern Ireland) 2000 (S.R. 2000 No. 114)
 Motor Vehicles (Driving Licences) (Amendment) Regulations (Northern Ireland) 2000 (S.R. 2000 No. 115)
 Rates (Amendment) (1998 Order) (Commencement No. 2) Order (Northern Ireland) 2000 (S.R. 2000 No. 116)
 Transport of Dangerous Goods (Safety Advisers) Regulations (Northern Ireland) 2000 (S.R. 2000 No. 119)
 Control of Substances Hazardous to Health Regulations (Northern Ireland) 2000 (S.R. 2000 No. 120)
 Education (Student Loans) (Repayment) Regulations (Northern Ireland) 2000 (S.R. 2000 No. 121)
 Employment Relations (1999 Order) (Commencement No. 3 and Transitional Provision) Order (Northern Ireland) 2000 (S.R. 2000 No. 122)
 Income-Related Benefits and Jobseeker's Allowance (Amendment) Regulations (Northern Ireland) 2000 (S.R. 2000 No. 125)
 Plant Health (Amendment No. 2) Order (Northern Ireland) 2000 (S.R. 2000 No. 126)
 Cereal Seeds (Amendment No. 2) Regulations (Northern Ireland) 2000 (S.R. 2000 No. 128)
 Motor Vehicles (Driving Licences) (Fees) (Amendment) Regulations (Northern Ireland) 2000 (S.R. 2000 No. 129)
 Motor Vehicles (Third-Party Risks) (Amendment) Regulations (Northern Ireland) 2000 (S.R. 2000 No. 131)
 Welfare Reform and Pensions (1999 Order) (Commencement No. 3) Order (Northern Ireland) 2000 (S.R. 2000 No. 133)
 Pneumoconiosis, etc., (Workers' Compensation) (Payment of Claims) (Amendment) Regulations (Northern Ireland) 2000 (S.R. 2000 No. 134)
 Social Security (National Insurance Number Information: Exemption) Regulations (Northern Ireland) 2000 (S.R. 2000 No. 135)
 Public Service Vehicles (Conditions of Fitness, Equipment and Use) (Amendment) Regulations (Northern Ireland) 2000 (S.R. 2000 No. 136)
 Seed Potatoes (Crop Fees) Regulations (Northern Ireland) 2000 (S.R. 2000 No. 138)
 Children (1995 Order) (Commencement No. 4) Order (Northern Ireland) 2000 (S.R. 2000 No. 139)
 Equality (Disability, etc.) (2000 Order) (Commencement No. 1) Order (Northern Ireland) 2000 (S.R. 2000 No. 140)
 Pensions on Divorce etc. (Provision of Information) Regulations (Northern Ireland) 2000 (S.R. 2000 No. 142)
 Pensions on Divorce etc. (Charging) Regulations (Northern Ireland) 2000 (S.R. 2000 No. 143)
 Pension Sharing (Valuation) Regulations (Northern Ireland) 2000 (S.R. 2000 No. 144)
 Pension Sharing (Implementation and Discharge of Liability) Regulations (Northern Ireland) 2000 (S.R. 2000 No. 145)
 Pension Sharing (Pension Credit Benefit) Regulations (Northern Ireland) 2000 (S.R. 2000 No. 146)
 Pension Sharing (Safeguarded Rights) Regulations (Northern Ireland) 2000 (S.R. 2000 No. 147)
 Motor Cars (Driving Instruction) (Fees) (Amendment) Regulations (Northern Ireland) 2000 (S.R. 2000 No. 148)
 Public Service Vehicles (Amendment) Regulations (Northern Ireland) 2000 (S.R. 2000 No. 149)
 Motor Vehicles (Driving Licences) (Amendment) (Test Fees) Regulations (Northern Ireland) 2000 (S.R. 2000 No. 150)
 Motor Vehicle Testing (Amendment) Regulations (Northern Ireland) 2000 (S.R. 2000 No. 151)
 Goods Vehicles (Testing) (Fees) (Amendment) Regulations (Northern Ireland) 2000 (S.R. 2000 No. 152)
 Razor Shells (Prohibition of Fishing) (Amendment) Regulations (Northern Ireland) 2000 (S.R. 2000 No. 157)
 Undersized Whiting (Revocation) Order (Northern Ireland) 2000 (S.R. 2000 No. 158)
 Local Government (General Grant) Order (Northern Ireland) 2000 (S.R. 2000 No. 160)
 Motor Cycles (Eye Protectors) Regulations (Northern Ireland) 2000 (S.R. 2000 No. 161)
 Land Registration (Amendment) Rules (Northern Ireland) 2000 (S.R. 2000 No. 165)
 Land Registry (Fees) Order (Northern Ireland) 2000 (S.R. 2000 No. 167)
 Census Order (Northern Ireland) 2000 (S.R. 2000 No. 168)
 Road Vehicles Lighting Regulations (Northern Ireland) 2000 (S.R. 2000 No. 169)
 Transport of Explosives (Safety Advisers) Regulations (Northern Ireland) 2000 (S.R. 2000 No. 171)
 Education (Student Support) (Amendment) Regulations (Northern Ireland) 2000 (S.R. 2000 No. 175)
 Local Government Pension Scheme Regulations (Northern Ireland) 2000 (S.R. 2000 No. 177)
 Local Government Pension Scheme (Management and Investment of Funds) Regulations (Northern Ireland) 2000 (S.R. 2000 No. 178)
 Inspection of Premises, Children and Records (Children Accommodated in Schools) Regulations (Northern Ireland) 2000 (S.R. 2000 No. 179)
 Social Security (Claims and Payments) (Amendment) Regulations (Northern Ireland) 2000 (S.R. 2000 No. 181)
 Welfare Reform and Pensions (1999 Order) (Commencement No. 4) Order (Northern Ireland) 2000 (S.R. 2000 No. 182)
 Social Security Revaluation of Earnings Factors Order (Northern Ireland) 2000 (S.R. 2000 No. 183)
 Horse Racing (Charges on Bookmakers) Order (Northern Ireland) 2000 (S.R. 2000 No. 184)
 Food (Animal Products from Belgium) (Emergency Control) (Revocation) Order (Northern Ireland) 2000 (S.R. 2000 No. 185)
 Tetrachloroethylene in Olive Oil (Revocation) Regulations (Northern Ireland) 2000 (S.R. 2000 No. 186)
 Medical Food Regulations (Northern Ireland) 2000 (S.R. 2000 No. 187)
 Colours in Food (Amendment) Regulations (Northern Ireland) 2000 (S.R. 2000 No. 188)
 Genetically Modified and Novel Foods (Labelling) Regulations (Northern Ireland) 2000 (S.R. 2000 No. 189)
 Food Protection (Shellfish Emergency Prohibitions) (Strangford Lough) (Revocation) Order (Northern Ireland) 2000 (S.R. 2000 No. 190)
 Meat (Enhanced Enforcement Powers) Regulations (Northern Ireland) 2000 (S.R. 2000 No. 191)
 Employment Rights (Time Off for Study or Training) (1998 Order) (Commencement) Order (Northern Ireland) 2000 (S.R. 2000 No. 192)
 Employment Rights (Time Off for Study or Training) Regulations (Northern Ireland) 2000 (S.R. 2000 No. 193)
 Ionising Radiation (Medical Exposure) Regulations (Northern Ireland) 2000 (S.R. 2000 No. 194)
 Social Security (Attendance Allowance and Disability Living Allowance) (Amendment) Regulations (Northern Ireland) 2000 (S.R. 2000 No. 195)
 Income Support (General) (Standard Interest Rate Amendment No. 2) Regulations (Northern Ireland) 2000 (S.R. 2000 No. 196)
 Jobseeker's Allowance (Amendment No. 3) Regulations (Northern Ireland) 2000 (S.R. 2000 No. 197)
 Census Regulations (Northern Ireland) 2000 (S.R. 2000 No. 198)
 Fair Employment (Specification of Public Authorities) Order (Northern Ireland) 2000 (S.R. 2000 No. 199)
 Crabs and Lobsters (Minimum Size) Order (Northern Ireland) 2000 (S.R. 2000 No. 200)

201-300

 Motor Hackney Carriage (Newry) (Amendment) Bye-Laws (Northern Ireland) 2000 (S.R. 2000 No. 203)
 Welfare Reform and Pensions (1999 Order) (Commencement No. 5) Order (Northern Ireland) 2000 (S.R. 2000 No. 209)
 Divorce etc. (Pensions) Regulations (Northern Ireland) 2000 (S.R. 2000 No. 210)
 Criminal Evidence (1999 Order) (Commencement No. 1) Order (Northern Ireland) 2000 (S.R. 2000 No. 211)
 Legal Aid in Criminal Proceedings (Costs) (Amendment) Rules (Northern Ireland) 2000 (S.R. 2000 No. 212)
 Education (Student Support) Regulations (Northern Ireland) 2000 (S.R. 2000 No. 213)
 Social Security (Industrial Injuries) (Prescribed Diseases) (Amendment) Regulations (Northern Ireland) 2000 (S.R. 2000 No. 214)
 Social Security and Child Support (Miscellaneous Amendments) Regulations (Northern Ireland) 2000 (S.R. 2000 No. 215)
 Game Birds Preservation Order (Northern Ireland) 2000 (S.R. 2000 No. 216)
 General Medical Services (Amendment) Regulations (Northern Ireland) 2000 (S.R. 2000 No. 217)
 Criminal Evidence (1999 Order) (Commencement No. 2) Order (Northern Ireland) 2000 (S.R. 2000 No. 218)
 Part-time Workers (Prevention of Less Favourable Treatment) Regulations (Northern Ireland) 2000S.R. 2000 No. 219)
 Housing Benefit (General) (Amendment No. 3) Regulations (Northern Ireland) 2000 (S.R. 2000 No. 221)
 Income Support (General) and Jobseeker's Allowance (Amendment) Regulations (Northern Ireland) 2000 (S.R. 2000 No. 222)
 Anthrax (Amendment) Order (Northern Ireland) 2000 (S.R. 2000 No. 224)
 Anthrax (Vaccination) Scheme Order (Northern Ireland) 2000 (S.R. 2000 No. 225)
 Criminal Justice (Northern Ireland) Order 1996 (Extension of Group A Offences) Order 2000 (S.R. 2000 No. 226)
 Crown Court (Amendment) Rules (Northern Ireland) 2000 (S.R. 2000 No. 227)
 Fair Employment (Monitoring) (Amendment) Regulations (Northern Ireland) 2000 (S.R. 2000 No. 228)
 Environmental Protection (Disposal of Polychlorinated Biphenyls and other Dangerous Substances) Regulations (Northern Ireland) 2000 (S.R. 2000 No. 232)
 Animal Feedingstuffs from Belgium (Control) (Revocation) Regulations (Northern Ireland) 2000 (S.R. 2000 No. 233)
 Processed Cereal-based Foods and Baby Foods for Infants and Young Children (Amendment) Regulations (Northern Ireland) 2000 (S.R. 2000 No. 234)
 Infant Formula and Follow-on Formula (Amendment) Regulations (Northern Ireland) 2000 (S.R. 2000 No. 235)
 Industrial Training Levy (Construction Industry) Order (Northern Ireland) 2000 (S.R. 2000 No. 240)
 Social Security (Students Amendment) Regulations (Northern Ireland) 2000 (S.R. 2000 No. 241)
 Social Security (Students and Income-Related Benefits Amendment) Regulations (Northern Ireland) 2000 (S.R. 2000 No. 242)
 Rules of the Supreme Court (Northern Ireland) (Amendment No. 2) 2000 (S.R. 2000 No. 243)
 Education (Student Loans) (Amendment) Regulations (Northern Ireland) 2000 (S.R. 2000 No. 244)
 Social Security (Personal Allowances for Children Amendment) Regulations (Northern Ireland) 2000 (S.R. 2000 No. 245)
 Social Security (Contributions) (Republic of Korea) Order (Northern Ireland) 2000 (S.R. 2000 No. 246)
 Insolvency (Amendment) Rules (Northern Ireland) 2000 (S.R. 2000 No. 247)
 Foyle Area (Rivers Finn and Foyle Angling Permits) Regulations 2000 (S.R. 2000 No. 248)
 Housing Benefit (General) (Amendment No. 4) Regulations (Northern Ireland) 2000 (S.R. 2000 No. 249)
 Students Awards (Amendment) Regulations (Northern Ireland) 2000 (S.R. 2000 No. 250)
 Social Security (Therapeutic Earnings Limits) (Amendment) Regulations (Northern Ireland) 2000 (S.R. 2000 No. 251)
 Animals and Animal Products (Import and Export) Regulations (Northern Ireland) 2000 (S.R. 2000 No. 253)
  Education (Student Support) (2000 Regulations) (Amendment) Regulations (Northern Ireland) 2000 (S.R. 2000 No. 254)
 Jobseeker's Allowance (Amendment No. 4) Regulations (Northern Ireland) 2000 (S.R. 2000 No. 255)
 Social Fund (Winter Fuel Payment and Maternity and Funeral Expenses (General)) (Amendment) Regulations (Northern Ireland) 2000 (S.R. 2000 No. 259)
 Social Security (Bereavement Benefits Amendment) Regulations (Northern Ireland) 2000 (S.R. 2000 No. 260)
 Industrial Tribunals (Constitution and Rules of Procedure) (Amendment) Regulations (Northern Ireland) 2000 (S.R. 2000 No. 261)
 Stakeholder Pension Schemes Regulations (Northern Ireland) 2000 (S.R. 2000 No. 262)
 Social Security (Attendance Allowance and Disability Living Allowance) (Amendment No. 2) Regulations (Northern Ireland) 2000 (S.R. 2000 No. 263)
 Students Awards (Amendment No. 2) Regulations (Northern Ireland) 2000 (S.R. 2000 No. 264)
 Housing Benefit (General) (Amendment No. 5) Regulations (Northern Ireland) 2000 (S.R. 2000 No. 265)
 Social Security (Payments on account, Overpayments and Recovery) (Amendment) Regulations (Northern Ireland) 2000 (S.R. 2000 No. 266)
 Prison and Young Offenders Centre (Amendment) Rules (Northern Ireland) 2000 (S.R. 2000 No. 267)
 Housing Benefit (General) (Amendment No. 6) Regulations (Northern Ireland) 2000 (S.R. 2000 No. 268)
 Welfare of Farmed Animals Regulations (Northern Ireland) 2000 (S.R. 2000 No. 270)
 Magistrates' Courts (Human Rights Act 1998) Rules (Northern Ireland) 2000 (S.R. 2000 No. 278)
 Magistrates' Courts (Amendment) Rules (Northern Ireland) 2000 (S.R. 2000 No. 279)
 County Court (Amendment) Rules (Northern Ireland) 2000 (S.R. 2000 No. 282)
 Waterside, Coleraine Cycle/Pedestrian Bridge Order (Northern Ireland) 2000 (S.R. 2000 No. 283)
 Meat (Disease Control) Regulations (Northern Ireland) 2000 (S.R. 2000 No. 287)
 Salaries (Assembly Ombudsman and Commissioner for Complaints) Order (Northern Ireland) 2000 (S.R. 2000 No. 292)
 Transport of Animals and Poultry (Cleansing and Disinfection) Order (Northern Ireland) 2000 (S.R. 2000 No. 293)
 Specified Risk Material (Amendment) Regulations (Northern Ireland) 2000 (S.R. 2000 No. 295)
 Education (Student Support) (Amendment No. 2) Regulations (Northern Ireland) 2000 (S.R. 2000 No. 296)
 Motor Vehicles (Driving Licences) (Amendment No. 2) Regulations (Northern Ireland) 2000 (S.R. 2000 No. 297)
 Marketing of Potatoes (Amendment) Regulations (Northern Ireland) 2000 (S.R. 2000 No. 298)
 Seed Potatoes (Tuber and Label Fees) (Amendment) Regulations (Northern Ireland) 2000 (S.R. 2000 No. 299)
 Magistrates' Courts (Domestic Proceedings) (Amendment) Rules (Northern Ireland) 2000 (S.R. 2000 No. 300)

301-400

 Sheep Annual Premium (Amendment) Regulations (Northern Ireland) 2000 (S.R. 2000 No. 301)
 Education (1998 Order) (Commencement No. 4) Order (Northern Ireland) 2000 (S.R. 2000 No. 302)
 Food Irradiation Provisions Regulations (Northern Ireland) 2000 (S.R. 2000 No. 303)
 Level Crossing (Antrim) Order (Northern Ireland) 2000 (S.R. 2000 No. 305)
 Level Crossing (Kingsmoss East)) Order (Northern Ireland) 2000 (S.R. 2000 No. 306)
 Level Crossing (Kingsmoss West) Order (Northern Ireland) 2000 (S.R. 2000 No. 307)
 Level Crossing (Ballymartin) Order (Northern Ireland) 2000 (S.R. 2000 No. 308)
 Level Crossing (Kilmakee) Order (Northern Ireland) 2000 (S.R. 2000 No. 309)
 Level Crossing (Kingsbog) Order (Northern Ireland) 2000 (S.R. 2000 No. 310)
 Students Awards Regulations (Northern Ireland) 2000 (S.R. 2000 No. 311)
 Compulsory Registration of Title Order (Northern Ireland) 2000 (S.R. 2000 No. 312)
 Police and Criminal Evidence (Application to Police Ombudsman) Order (Northern Ireland) 2000 (S.R. 2000 No. 314)
 Royal Ulster Constabulary (Conduct) Regulations 2000 (S.R. 2000 No. 315)
 Royal Ulster Constabulary (Unsatisfactory Performance) Regulations 2000 (S.R. 2000 No. 316)
 Royal Ulster Constabulary (Appeals) Regulations 2000 (S.R. 2000 No. 317)
 Royal Ulster Constabulary (Complaints etc.) Regulations 2000 (S.R. 2000 No. 318)
 Royal Ulster Constabulary (Complaints) (Informal Resolution) Regulations 2000 (S.R. 2000 No. 319)
 Royal Ulster Constabulary (Conduct) (Senior Officer) Regulations 2000 (S.R. 2000 No. 320)
 Social Fund Winter Fuel Payment (Amendment) Regulations (Northern Ireland) 2000 (S.R. 2000 No. 321)
 Disabled Persons (Badges for Motor Vehicles) (Amendment No. 2) Regulations (Northern Ireland) 2000 (S.R. 2000 No. 322)
 Statutory Maternity Pay (General) (Modification and Amendment) Regulations (Northern Ireland) 2000 (S.R. 2000 No. 324)
 Housing Renovation etc. Grants (Reduction of Grant) (Amendment No. 2) Regulations (Northern Ireland) 2000 (S.R. 2000 No. 325)
 Bus Permits (Designated Bodies) (Amendment) (Northern Ireland) Order 2000 (S.R. 2000 No. 327)
 Public Service Vehicles (Amendment No. 2) Regulations (Northern Ireland) 2000 (S.R. 2000 No. 328)
 Family Proceedings (Amendment) Rules (Northern Ireland) 2000 (S.R. 2000 No. 329)
 Motor Vehicles (Compulsory Insurance) Regulations (Northern Ireland) 2000 (S.R. 2000 No. 331)
 Welfare Reform and Pensions (1999 Order) (Commencement No. 6 and Transitional and Savings Provisions) Order (Northern Ireland) 2000 (S.R. 2000 No. 332)
 Rates Regulations (Northern Ireland) 2000 (S.R. 2000 No. 333)
 Flags (2000 Order) (Commencement) Order (Northern Ireland) 2000 (S.R. 2000 No. 334)
 Pension Sharing (Consequential and Miscellaneous Amendments) Regulations (Northern Ireland) 2000 (S.R. 2000 No. 335)
 Pension Sharing (Contracting-out) (Consequential Amendments) Regulations (Northern Ireland) 2000 (S.R. 2000 No. 336)
 Travelling Expenses and Remission of Charges (Amendment No. 2) Regulations (Northern Ireland) 2000 (S.R. 2000 No. 339)
 Social Fund Winter Fuel Payment (Temporary Increase) Regulations (Northern Ireland) 2000 (S.R. 2000 No. 340)
 Optical Charges and Payments (Amendment No. 2) Regulations (Northern Ireland) 2000 (S.R. 2000 No. 341)
 New Valuation List (Time and Class of Hereditaments) Order (Northern Ireland) 2000 (S.R. 2000 No. 342)
 Animals (Records) (Amendment) Order (Northern Ireland) 2000 (S.R. 2000 No. 344)
 Common Agricultural Policy Support Schemes (Modulation) Regulations (Northern Ireland) 2000 (S.R. 2000 No. 346)
 Flags Regulations (Northern Ireland) 2000 (S.R. 2000 No. 347)
 Personal Pension Schemes (Payments by Employers) Regulations (Northern Ireland) 2000 (S.R. 2000 No. 349)
 Jobseeker's Allowance (Joint Claims) Regulations (Northern Ireland) 2000 (S.R. 2000 No. 350)
 Child Support, Pensions and Social Security (2000 Act) (Commencement No. 1) Order (Northern Ireland) 2000 (S.R. 2000 No. 358)
 Social Security (Contracting-out and Qualifying Earnings Factor and Revision of Relevant Pensions) Regulations (Northern Ireland) 2000 (S.R. 2000 No. 360)
 Child Benefit (General) (Amendment) Regulations (Northern Ireland) 2000 (S.R. 2000 No. 361)
 Sharing of State Scheme Rights (Provision of Information and Valuation) Regulations (Northern Ireland) 2000 (S.R. 2000 No. 362)
 Eel Fishing (Licence Duties) Regulations (Northern Ireland) 2000 (S.R. 2000 No. 363)
 Fisheries (Amendment No. 3) Byelaws (Northern Ireland) 2000 (S.R. 2000 No. 364)
 Social Security (Joint Claims: Consequential Amendments) Regulations (Northern Ireland) 2000 (S.R. 2000 No. 365)
 Social Security (Capital Limits and Earnings Disregards Amendment) Regulations (Northern Ireland) 2000 (S.R. 2000 No. 366)
 Social Security (Enhanced Disability Premium Amendment) Regulations (Northern Ireland) 2000 (S.R. 2000 No. 367)
 Occupational Pensions (Revaluation) Order (Northern Ireland) 2000 (S.R. 2000 No. 368)
 Social Security (New Deal Pilot) Regulations (Northern Ireland) 2000 (S.R. 2000 No. 369)
 Fair Employment (Specification of Public Authorities) (No. 2) Order (Northern Ireland) 2000 (S.R. 2000 No. 371)
 Employment Relations (1999 Order) (Commencement No. 4 and Transitional Provisions) Order (Northern Ireland) 2000 (S.R. 2000 No. 373)
 Child Support, Pensions and Social Security (2000 Act) (Commencement No. 2) Order (Northern Ireland) 2000 (S.R. 2000 No. 374)
 Ionising Radiations Regulations (Northern Ireland) 2000 (S.R. 2000 No. 375)
 Fire Services (Amendment) (1998 Order) (Commencement) Order (Northern Ireland) 2000 (S.R. 2000 No. 376)
 Social Security (Contributions) (Japan) Order (Northern Ireland) 2000 (S.R. 2000 No. 377)
 Individual Learning Accounts Regulations (Northern Ireland) 2000 (S.R. 2000 No. 379)
 Social Security (Disclosure of State Pension Information) Regulations (Northern Ireland) 2000 (S.R. 2000 No. 380)
 Occupational Pension Schemes (Republic of Ireland Schemes Exemption) Regulations (Northern Ireland) 2000 (S.R. 2000 No. 382)
 Education (Listed Bodies) Order (Northern Ireland) 2000 (S.R. 2000 No. 385)
 Northern Ireland Policing Board (Prescribed Period) Regulations 2000 (S.R. 2000 No. 386)
 Criminal Appeal (Amendment) (Northern Ireland) Rules 2000 (S.R. 2000 No. 387)
 Management of Health and Safety at Work Regulations (Northern Ireland) 2000 (S.R. 2000 No. 388)
 Building Regulations (Northern Ireland) 2000 (S.R. 2000 No. 389)
 Courses for Drink-Drive Offenders (Designation of Districts) Order (Northern Ireland) 2000 (S.R. 2000 No. 390)
 Superannuation (Equality Commission for Northern Ireland) Order (Northern Ireland) 2000 (S.R. 2000 No. 391)
 Superannuation (Northern Ireland Assembly Commission) Order (Northern Ireland) 2000 (S.R. 2000 No. 392)
 Rules of the Supreme Court (Northern Ireland) (Amendment No. 3) 2000 (S.R. 2000 No. 393)
 Courses for Drink-Drive Offenders (Experimental Period) (Extension) Order (Northern Ireland) 2000 (S.R. 2000 No. 395)
 Police (Northern Ireland) Act 1998 (Commencement) Order (Northern Ireland) 2000 (S.R. 2000 No. 399)

401-500

 Plastic Materials and Articles in Contact with Food (Amendment) Regulations (Northern Ireland) 2000 (S.R. 2000 No. 402)
 Trunk Road T8 (Toome Bypass) Order (Northern Ireland) 2000 (S.R. 2000 No. 403)
 Social Security (Incapacity Benefit) (Miscellaneous Amendments) Regulations (Northern Ireland) 2000 (S.R. 2000 No. 404)
 Petshops Regulations (Northern Ireland) 2000 (S.R. 2000 No. 405)
 Child Support, Pensions and Social Security (2000 Act) (Commencement No. 3) Order (Northern Ireland) 2000 (S.R. 2000 No. 406)
 Social Security (Australia) Order (Northern Ireland) 2000 (S.R. 2000 No. 407)
 New Valuation List Order (Northern Ireland) 2000 (S.R. 2000 No. 408)
 Police (Northern Ireland) Act 2000 (Commencement) Order 2000 (S.R. 2000 No. 412)

External links
  Statutory Rules (NI) List
 Draft Statutory Rules (NI) List

2000
Statutory rules
Northern Ireland Statutory Rules